Helga Bachmann (24 July 1931 – 7 January 2011) was an Icelandic actress and director.

Early life and education
Helga Bachmann was born in Reykjavík.

Career
She began her career in 1952 with the Reykjavík Theatre Company and was a permanent member of the company from 1962 to 1976, when she transferred to the National Theatre of Iceland, where she remained until her retirement in 2000.

In addition to the stage, she appeared in films including the film of Halldór Laxness's The Atom Station (1984) and In the Shadow of the Raven (1988).

She was the first director of the Icelandic internet broadcasting service, from 1984 to 1987, and served on the board of the Actors' Peace Association (Friðarsamtak listamanna).

Honours
In 1968, she was the second woman to be awarded the Silver Lamp Award for the best performance by an actor, for the title role in Henrik Ibsen's Hedda Gabler. In 1984 she was awarded the Knight's Cross of the Order of the Falcon.

Private life
She was married to Helgi Skúlason, also an actor, until his death in 1996. They had two sons and a daughter; she also had a daughter from a previous relationship. Their son Skúli Helgason has twice been elected as a representative in the Althing.

References

Further reading
 Obituary at National Theatre of Iceland, 11 January 2011,

External links

1931 births
2011 deaths
Helga Bachmann
Helga Bachmann
Knights of the Order of the Falcon
Helga Bachmann
Helga Bachmann